Joan Sophie Crosby ( Brock; 1920–2013) was an English international table tennis player.

Table tennis career
Crosby won double silver at the 1949 World Table Tennis Championships in the women's team event and the women's doubles with Pinkie Barnes.

Personal life
Joan Brock married Donald "Driver" Peter Crosby in Exeter in September 1940. She died in Devon in 2013.

See also
 List of England players at the World Team Table Tennis Championships
 List of World Table Tennis Championships medalists

References

1920 births
2013 deaths
English female table tennis players
World Table Tennis Championships medalists